The Corfe River is one of the four main rivers flowing into Poole Harbour in the county of Dorset, England.

Name 
The Saxon name for Corfe River was the Wichen; this survives in the names of Wytch Farm, Upper Wych Channel, Wytch Heath and Wytch, or Wych, Lake. Wichen may have derived from wics which meant "dairy farm", an indication that the area may not always have been heathland.

Course 

The river initially flows eastwards towards Corfe Castle. Just before reaching the village it swings north-northeast through the gap in the Purbecks between West Hill and East Hill and continues across Wytch Heath before emptying into Wych (or Wytch) Lake on the southern side of Poole Harbour.

Water quality
The Environment Agency measures the water quality of the river systems in England. Each is given an overall ecological status, which may be one of five levels: high, good, moderate, poor and bad. There are several components that are used to determine this, including biological status, which looks at the quantity and varieties of invertebrates, angiosperms and fish. Chemical status, which compares the concentrations of various chemicals against known safe concentrations, is rated good or fail.

Water quality of the Corfe River in 2019:

References

Rivers of Dorset
1Corfe